Sondika (Spanish, Sondica) is a town and municipality located in the province of Biscay, in the Autonomous Community of Basque Country, northern Spain.

Situated directly south of the runway of Bilbao Airport, it is the location of Bilbao British Cemetery, containing a Commonwealth War Graves Cemetery with 58 casualties (not to be confused with a far larger municipal cemetery in neighbouring Derio).

References

External links
 Bilbao British Cemetery at Commonwealth War Graves Commission

Municipalities in Biscay